Thiri Zeya Thura (also spelled Thiri Zeyathura) was a 15th-century Burmese royal who served as a vassal ruler under several kings of Ava. A nephew of both King Mohnyin Thado and Queen Shin Myat Hla of Ava, he was governor of Taungdwin from 1441 to the 1470s or later, and held key governorships, notably at Toungoo (Taungoo) and Kale (Kalay).

He was also the father of Queen Taungdwin Minthami of Ava (r. 1502–1527).

Early life
He was born to a minor noble family of Thiri Zeya Thura the Elder and Shin Myat Hla in the central region of Ava Kingdom. Probably born in the late 1410s, he became a prominent member of the ruling dynasty in May 1426 when his maternal elder uncle Thado successfully seized the Ava throne. He was also a nephew of Queen Shin Myat Hla of Ava, Thado's chief queen consort. The familial ties were further cemented when his older sister Min Hla Nyet was wedded to Thado's eldest son and the new crown prince, Minye Kyawswa at the coronation ceremony of Thado. Later in August 1426, his parents were appointed governor and duchess of Pakhan by the king.

His first governorship came in early 1434. The king appointed his nephew governor of Pyinzi with the title of Thiri Zeya Thura, his father's title. He was also wedded to Princess Saw Pyei Chantha, a daughter of King Thihathu of Ava (r. 1421–1425) and Queen Saw Min Hla.

Career

Thiri Zeya Thura the Younger spent the next four decades as a loyal vassal under several kings: his uncle Mohnyin Thado, his brothers-in-law and first cousins Minye Kyawswa I and Narapati I, and his nephew Thihathura of Ava.

Northern frontier years
His role expanded greatly in the reign of his brother-in-law King Minye Kyawswa I of Ava (r. 1439–1442). In 1439, he was appointed sawbwa of Kale (Kalay) by the new king. The appointment came after a successful expedition by Gov. Thihapate of Pakhan that brought back the northern Shan states of Mohnyin and Kale into Ava's fold. Thiri Zeya Thura's job was to assist Thihapate, who too was transferred to Mohnyin, which directly bordered Mong Mao and Ming China, in holding Ava's forward bases in the north. In 1441, the king added Taungdwin, a former vassal state that the king's armies had just captured, to Thiri Zeya Thura's portfolio. It was a symbolic gesture by the king as Taungdwin was the longtime fief of Thiri Zeya Thura's paternal grandfather Thihapate II of Taungdwin.

His most well-known accomplishment came during his stay at Kale. In the dry season of 1441–1442, he served as the deputy of Thihapate in the successful siege of Mogaung that captured Tho Ngan Bwa, the supreme sawbwa (lord) of Mong Mao. Because King Minye Kyawswa I had died, the duo rushed back to the capital Ava (Inwa), arriving just on the eve of the coronation ceremony of King Narapati, and formally presented the defeated sawbwa Tho Ngan Bwa to the new king at the ceremony the next day, on 6 April 1442.

Thiri Zeya Thura remained posted at Kale for the next eight plus years. In 1450/51, he was permanently transferred to Taungdwin after the death of Thihapate of Mohnyin, and the subsequent rebellion of Thihapate's eldest son Min Uti. The king decided to install his son-in-law, who was given the title of Minye Kyawswa, at Kale.

Taungdwin years
At Taungdwin, Thiri Zeya Thura would rule the small vassal state, 240 km south of Ava, for the next 20+ years. He proved to be a loyal vassal. He fully supported King Narapati in 1452 when nearby Toungoo (Taungoo) was seized by Prince Minye Kyawhtin. For his steadfast loyalty, he was appointed governor of Toungoo after Minye Kyawhtin's death in 1459, alongside his current fief of Taungdwin. He ruled both states until 1466 when he was removed from the Toungoo post. According to a contemporary mawgun inscription, he and his chief wife Saw Pyei Chantha remained in charge of Taungdwin in 1472/73 when they pledged their loyalty to King Thihathura of Ava. (Although he may have been removed from Toungoo because the king no longer trusted him, it was his successor at Toungoo Letya Zala Thingyan that raised a rebellion against Ava.)

Thiri Zeya Thura was probably still alive in the 1480s, if not later. He had a daughter who was likely born in the late 1470s or the early 1480s since she became a queen consort of King Narapati II in February 1502. Chronicles do not say when his rule ended at Taungdwin; they only say that Thiri Zeya Thura's son Min Sit-Tha was confirmed as governor of Taungdwin by the new king Narapati II of Ava in February 1502.

Family
His first wife and chief consort was Princess Saw Pyei Chantha, whom he married in 1434. He had at least three children, two of whom got married in 1502.

Ancestry
He was a nephew of both King Mohnyin Thado and Queen Shin Myat Hla of Ava, and a grandson of Gov. Thihapate II of Taungdwin.

Notes

References

Bibliography

 
 
 
 
 

Ava dynasty
1410s births